Milan Rastavac (born 1 November 1973) is a Serbian professional football manager and former player.

Playing career 
Rastavac started his playing career in Vojvodina youth squad. During his playing career, his greatest success came in 1988–1989. He played on the national team of Yugoslavia (U16) with Mirko Jozić as a head coach. From 1990-1991 he played on the FC Vojvodina U19 team that was the champion of SFR Yugoslavia with Ilija Pantelić as a head coach. After a season in Dinamo Pančevo, he moved to club Mladost Bački Jarak member of Serbia and Montenegro first league, where in 1999 he ended his professional career at the age of 26.

Managerial career

Beginning 
Rastavac started his coaching career as a coach assistant in Al-Nasr Benghazi senior team with Todor Veselinović as a head coach. He worked as a youth coach in Novi Sad with different age groups from U15 - U19 in a five-year period. In season 2004-2005 he won the Vojvodina Cup with Novi Sad U17 team.

FA Serbia 
In 2006, he started to work for the Football Association of Serbia as an instructor with the different age groups from U12 to U16 and stayed at this position until 2013. As a head of instructor service he was one of the creators of different programs for different age groups of FA Serbia. In 2007, he became a lecturer at UEFA coaching school of FA Serbia. From 2013–2014 he was a member of expert committee of FA Serbia.

Serbia Women U19 
In an idea for practical implementation programs he managed Serbia women's national under-19 football team and was coach in women's A national team in period from 2010–2013. In 2011 they won first historical point on the elite round for the Euro qualifications. In 2011 they were on the EURO finals for U19 first and only time in Serbia WU19 history. In 2013 Serbia WU19 was the top scorer team in Euro qualifications with more than 6 goals per match.

Olimpija Ljubljana 
In 2013, he worked as assistant coach at Olimpija Ljubljana (Slovenia) with Milorad Kosanović.

Vojvodina 
In 2014, he worked as assistant coach at Vojvodina(Serbia) with Zoran Marić. During first semi season Vojvodina achieved the best season start in 100 years club history.

Radnički Niš 
In 2015 his first job as a head coach was in Serbian SuperLiga club FK Radnički Niš. Under Rastavac, Radnički reached best semi season score in the past 33 years, and fewest goals (6) received per semi season in the club history. He makes great continuity of results and won 5th place twice in season 2015–16 as well as in season 2016–17.

Serbia U23 
In December 2015 he started to work as the head coach of the Serbia U23 national team. In a friendly match against Qatar Serbia has won 3–0.

Xanthi 
From 12 June 2017 he started to work as the head coach of the Super League Greece club Xanthi.

Managerial statistics 
As of 24 February 2023

References 

1973 births
Living people
People from Vršac
Serbian footballers
Association football midfielders
FK Vojvodina players
FK Dinamo Pančevo players
Serbian football managers
FK Radnički Niš managers
Xanthi F.C. managers
Asteras Tripolis F.C. managers
FK Vojvodina managers